WKYQ (93.3 FM) is a country music formatted radio station based in Paducah, Kentucky. WKYQ broadcasts with an effective radiated power of 100,000 watts and antenna 279 meters height above average terrain. WKYQ serves Paducah and western Kentucky, southern Illinois, northwest Tennessee, and parts of southeastern Missouri. WKYQ is owned by Bristol Broadcasting Company, Inc.

Current line-up
As of June 2022 the on-air line-up for WKYQ is as follows:

Weekdays
 Bobby & Steve in the morning 6a-10a
 "Dr." Jeff 10a-3p
 Mark Ryan 3p-7p
 Matt 7p-Midnight

Weekends
 There is a rotating live local air staff on the weekends.  with some local and syndicated programs.
 The Outlaw Hours, Friday night 10p -Saturday 3a and Saturday night 10p - Sunday 3a
 Topper's Country Gospel, Sunday 7a-9a
 The Rabbit Countdown, Sunday 11a-3p
 CT40 with Fitz, Sunday 6p-10p
 Retro Country USA, Sunday 10p-Midnight

References

External links
 
 

KYQ